North Dorset was a local government district in Dorset, England, between 1974 and 2019. Its area was largely rural, but included the towns of Blandford Forum, Gillingham, Shaftesbury, Stalbridge and Sturminster Newton. Much of North Dorset was in the River Stour valley, known as the Blackmore Vale. The economy of North Dorset was largely based on dairy agriculture.

The district was formed on 1 April 1974, under the Local Government Act 1972, from the municipal boroughs of Blandford Forum, Shaftesbury, Blandford Rural District, Shaftesbury Rural District and Sturminster Rural District. The district and its council were abolished on 1 April 2019 and, together with the other four Dorset districts outside the greater Bournemouth area, incorporated into a Dorset unitary authority.

At the 2001 UK census North Dorset had a population of 61,905, a rise of 8,300 from 1991, with 25,248 households.

North Dorset is home to North Dorset Rugby Football Club.

District Council 

North Dorset District Council had its main offices on Salisbury Road, Blandford Forum. Councillors were elected every four years; the final election before abolition was held in 2015.

Settlements
Towns with a population over 2,500 are in bold.
Anderson, Ashmore
Belchalwell, Blandford Forum, Bourton, Bryanston, Buckhorn Weston
Cann, Charlton Marshall, Chettle, Child Okeford, Compton Abbas
Durweston
East Orchard, East Stour
Farnham, Fifehead Magdalen, Fifehead Neville, Fontmell Magna
Gillingham, Glanvilles Wootton
Hammoon, Hazelbury Bryan, Hilton, Hinton St Mary
Ibberton, Iwerne Courtney, Iwerne Minster
Kington Magna
Langton Long Blandford, Lydlinch
Manston, Mappowder, Margaret Marsh, Marnhull, Melbury Abbas, Milborne St Andrew, Milton Abbas, Motcombe
Okeford Fitzpaine
Pimperne, Pulham
Shaftesbury, Shillingstone, Silton, Spetisbury, Stalbridge, Stoke Wake, Stourpaine, Stour Provost, Stourton Caundle, Stour Row, Sturminster Newton, Sutton Waldron
Tarrant Crawford, Tarrant Gunville, Tarrant Hinton, Tarrant Keyneston, Tarrant Launceston, Tarrant Monkton, Tarrant Rawston, Tarrant Rushton, Todber, Turnworth
West Orchard, West Stour, Winterborne Clenston, Winterborne Houghton, Winterborne Kingston, Winterborne Stickland, Winterborne Whitechurch, Winterborne Zelston, Woolland

See also 
 Grade II* listed buildings in North Dorset
 List of churches in North Dorset

References

External links

Official website, archived in March 2010

 
Former non-metropolitan districts
Non-metropolitan districts of Dorset
2019 disestablishments in England